Pravasi Mandira (Kannada: ಪ್ರವಾಸಿ ಮಂದಿರ) is a 1968 Indian Kannada film, directed and produced by Kalyan Kumar. The film stars Kalyan Kumar, Vandhana and R. N. Sudarshan in lead roles. The film had musical score by Rajan–Nagendra.

Cast
Kalyan Kumar
Vandhana
R. N. Sudarshan

References

External links
 

1960s Kannada-language films
Films scored by Rajan–Nagendra